Ed Mularchyk is a former award winning Canadian Football League player.

Mularchyk played with Windsor AKO Fratmen, helping win the national Junior championship in 1954 (against the Winnipeg Rods). He played one season with the Ottawa Rough Riders and won the Gruen Trophy as Canadian rookie of the year in the east, though there was some controversy surrounding his selection. He later attended the University of Western Ontario, playing football and becoming and ophthalmologist.

References

1933 births
1992 deaths
Sportspeople from Windsor, Ontario
Players of Canadian football from Ontario
Ottawa Rough Riders players
Canadian Football League Rookie of the Year Award winners
University of Western Ontario alumni
Western Mustangs football players